Lyskamm (formerly Lyskamm, literally "comb of the Lys"), also known as Silberbast (literally "silver bast"), is a mountain in the Pennine Alps lying on the border between Switzerland and Italy. It consists of a five-kilometre-long ridge with two distinct peaks. The mountain has gained a reputation for seriousness because of the many cornices lying on the ridge and the frequent avalanches, thus leading to its nickname the Menschenfresser ("people eater").

Geography 

Despite a prominence of well over 300 metres, Lyskamm is sometimes considered to be part of the extended Monte Rosa group (in fact the Dufourspitze is only 107 metres higher).

The northern side of the mountain is an impressive  ice-covered wall, rising up from the Grenzgletscher. The gentler southern side rises only a few hundred metres above the glacier of the same name: Lysgletscher.

Climbing history
The eastern and higher of the two peaks is 4,527 m, and was first ascended in 1861 from the Lisjoch up the east ridge by a 14-man team (seven Englishmen, one Scotsman, and six Swiss guides) led by J. F. Hardy and including William Edward Hall. Others in the party included A. C. Ramsey, F. Sibson, T. Rennison, J. A. Hudson, C. H. Pilkington and R. M. Stephenson. The guides were Franz Josef Lochmatter (1825-1897) of St. Niklaus in the canton Valais, J.-P. Cachet,  K. Kerr, S. Zumtaugwald, P. and J.-M. Perren.

The ridge as a whole (as well as the western summit) was first traversed three years later by Leslie Stephen, Edward N. Buxton, Jakob Anderegg and Franz Biener.

The first attempt to climb the imposing north-east face was made in 1880 by the brothers Kalbermatten. They were carried down to the glacier by an avalanche but they survived the accident. On 9 August 1890, L. Norman-Neruda with guides Christian Klucker and J. Reinstadler were the first to reach the summit (Lyskamm East) by the north face, by what is now known as the "Norman-Neruda route". The first winter ascent of this route was made on 11 March 1956 by C. Fosson and O. Frachey.

In 1907, Geoffrey Winthrop Young and his guide traversed the whole ridge two times. Young wanted to traverse the ridge from the Nordend to the Breithorn. They started from Riffelalp at midnight and finished the traverse of the Monte Rosa massif at midday. But after the traverse of the Lyskamm and Castor the guide was too tired. Young, who was very disappointed, convinced him to go back by the Lisjoch before descending to Zermatt, implying a second traverse on the Lyskamm. Young even wanted to continue back to the Nordend but his guide refused to prolong the journey.

Climbing routes
The normal route starts from the Lisjoch, which can be accessed from the Gnifetti Hut (3,650 m) or from the Monte Rosa Hut (2,883 m). The route follows the route taken by the first ascensionist.

The mountain is often climbed as a traverse from the Feliksjoch (West), to the Lisjoch (East) or vice versa. The traverse consists mostly of a narrow, snow-covered ridge, with some scrambling over rocks. In good conditions, this route is fairly easy and objectively safe, however in bad snow conditions and/or bad visibility, the ridge can be challenging because of large, sometimes double, cornices, mainly on the southern side of the ridge.

Bibliography
 W. E. Hall (1870) "The fatal accident on the Lyskamm", Alpine Journal, 5: 23–32

See also

List of Alpine four-thousanders

References

External links

 Lyskamm on Peakbagger.com
 Lyskamm on SummitPost
 Italian route account from south - Czech and English

Alpine four-thousanders
Mountains of the Alps
Mountains of Aosta Valley
Mountains of Valais
Pennine Alps
Italy–Switzerland border
International mountains of Europe
Mountains of Switzerland
Four-thousanders of Switzerland